The ninth and final season of the American dramatic television series Touched by an Angel aired CBS from September 28, 2002 through April 27, 2003, spanning 22 episodes. Created by John Masius and produced by Martha Williamson, the series chronicled the cases of two angels, Monica (Roma Downey) and her supervisor Tess (Della Reese), who bring messages from God to various people to help them as they reach a crossroads in their lives. They are frequently joined by Andrew (John Dye), the Angel of Death, and new trainee Gloria (Valerie Bertinelli). As the series drew to an end, Monica, now an experienced case worker, must pass a final test before she can be promoted to supervisor. (“I Will Walk with You”, Part 1 & 2)

The episodes use the song "Walk with You", performed by Reese, as their opening theme.

Ratings
The finale placed first on both nights. The first part was watched by 8.6 million viewers, and the second part was watched by 12.9 million viewers, placing first in its timeslot and night. The two parts combined averaged 10.75 million viewers.

Episodes

References

External links
 
 
 

Touched by an Angel seasons
2002 American television seasons
2003 American television seasons